The Moscopole printing house was a printing house founded in Moscopole, a former prosperous city in the Ottoman Empire and now in Albania. It was founded by monk Georgios Konstantinidis. Konstantinidis, owner of the printing house, was a teacher at the New Academy of Moscopole, and he might have been the same person as Gregory of Durrës. The printing house of Moscopole was founded in 1720 or in 1731, and was the second printing house in the Balkans after that of Constantinople (now Istanbul). The printing house of Moscopole produced religious literature and school textbooks using the Greek language. A total of nineteen books, mainly the collection of the Services to the Saints but also the Introduction of Grammar by the local scholar Theodore Kavalliotis, are known to have been printed in Moscopole. The printing house had close ties to the Monastery of Saint Naum, now in North Macedonia.

References

Moscopole
1720 establishments in Europe
1731 establishments in Europe
History of printing
Modern Greek Enlightenment
18th century in Albania
History of the Aromanians